Fraser Township may refer to the following places in the United States:

 Fraser Township, Michigan
 Fraser Township, Martin County, Minnesota

Township name disambiguation pages